Klemme is a German family name, and may refer to:
 People
 Dominic Klemme (born 1986), professional road bicycle racer
 Göran Klemme (born 1964), darts player
 Ralph Klemme, American politician
 Randy Klemme, (born 1960), American professional wrestler (1998-2008)

 Places
 Klemme, Iowa, United States
 Klemmes Corner, Indiana, United States

See also 
 Klem (disambiguation)
 Klemm, a surname

German-language surnames